John Watkins Oliver (December 17, 1914 – April 25, 1990) was a United States district judge of the United States District Court for the Western District of Missouri.

Education and career

Born in Cape Girardeau, Missouri, Oliver received an Artium Baccalaureus degree from the University of Missouri in 1933. He received a Bachelor of Laws from University of Missouri School of Law in 1936. He was in private practice of law in Kansas City, Missouri from 1936 to 1962.

Federal judicial service

Oliver was nominated by President John F. Kennedy on March 5, 1962, to a seat on the United States District Court for the Western District of Missouri vacated by Judge Randle Jasper Smith. He was confirmed by the United States Senate on April 2, 1962, and received his commission on April 3, 1962. He served as Chief Judge from 1977 to 1980. He assumed senior status on November 3, 1980. His service was terminated on April 25, 1990, due to his death in Kansas City.

References

Sources
 

1914 births
1990 deaths
People from Cape Girardeau, Missouri
Lawyers from Kansas City, Missouri
Judges of the United States District Court for the Western District of Missouri
United States district court judges appointed by John F. Kennedy
20th-century American judges
University of Missouri School of Law alumni
20th-century American lawyers